The Stadion Śląski is a sport stadium located on the premises of Silesian Park in Chorzów, Poland. The stadium has a fully covered capacity of 55,211, after a recent refurbishment completed in October 2017. The stadium hosted many Poland national football team matches and for many decades was Poland's national stadium. After the National Stadium in Warsaw had been completed, the Silesian Stadium lost that role. The stadium was not in operation between 2009 and 2017 due to its ongoing reconstruction.

Silesian Stadium is a UEFA Category 4 stadium and hosts the annual Kamila Skolimowska Memorial, a Diamond League meeting. The stadium will also host the athletics events of the 2023 European Games and the 2028 European Athletics Championships.

History
In 1950, as a part of an ambitious project to build Silesian Park, plans for Silesian Stadium were drawn up by Julian Brzuchowski. Construction began in 1951, and the stadium opened in 1956. The stadium was inaugurated on 22 July 1956 with a match against East Germany.

In 1993, the stadium officially was branded as Polish national stadium, due to the state of the venue in Warsaw. The stadium regularly hosted football matches, as well as concerts and other events.

Modernization
Silesian Stadium was one of the venues shortlisted for UEFA Euro 2012 tournament, but it did not make the final list. The venue was also shortlisted as the Polish candidate for UEFA Euro 2020.

From 2009, the stadium underwent modernization which included the construction of a 43,000 square metre roof, new stands, lighting, video screens and an improved sound system. The speedway track has been replaced with a traditional track that will allow Chorzów to host international athletics events. The new roof collapsed in 2011 putting project on hold. Though originally planned to be completed by autumn 2011 for 415 million złoty, the finishing touches were only completed in 2017 costing around 650 million złoty.

Events

Football

Poland national football team

Before renovation

After renovation

Club football
Numerous Ekstraklasa matches have been played - mostly by the local team Ruch Chorzów, especially for the Great Silesian Derby matches against neighbours Górnik Zabrze due to extra interest from the fans. As it used to be the only national stadium with such a large capacity in the country for numerous years, Polish Cup matches have been frequently hosted there too, especially the final matches.

Speedway
The first World Final held at the stadium in 1973, was run in front of the largest crowd in world speedway history. English speedway 'golden boy' Peter Collins won the 1976 World Final at Silesian.

Ivan Mauger won the 1979 World Final at the stadium. Silesian also hosted the Final of the 1974 Speedway World Team Cup, won by England, as well as the Final of both the 1978 and 1981 World Pairs Championships.

Track and field

In 1967, the Silesian Stadium hosted the Polish Athletics Championships. In 1969, during an athletics tournament between Poland, East Germany and Soviet Union, Nadezhda Chizhova became the first woman in history to break the 20 metre barrier in shot put, setting the world record at 20.09m. In 2010, an official bid to organize the World Athletics Championships in Chorzów was submitted, however, the city lost to Beijing in the selection process.

The Slaski Stadium has a Mondo Sportflex Super X 720 track that was laid down in 2017, which has features similar to other Mondo surfaces which were used for the last two World Athletics Championships as well as the Rio 2016 Olympic Games.

Between 9–10 June 2018, the 11th Polish Summer Paralympic Games took place at the Silesian Stadium. On 22 August 2018, the stadium was chosen to host the Kamila Skolimowska Memorial, which attracted 41,200 spectators.

In May 2021, Silesian Stadium hosted the 2021 World Athletics Relays and European Team Championships Super League.

Concerts and other events
Silesian Stadium has hosted large music concerts in its history by many artists and groups including The Rolling Stones, Metallica, Guns N' Roses, AC/DC, U2, Pearl Jam, Linkin Park, Iron Maiden, Red Hot Chili Peppers, Genesis, The Police, Behemoth,  Rammstein, Slipknot, Machine Head.

In 2009, it was the venue of performances by Monster Jam, and again in 2018.

See also
 Chorzów
 Silesian Park
 List of football stadiums in Poland

References

Gazeta Wyborcza
"Pół wieku Stadionu Śląskiego" Część 1, 26 czerwca 2006, page: 1, 2, 3, 4
"Pół wieku Stadionu Śląskiego" Część 3, 10 lipca 2006, page: 1, 2, 3, 4
"Pół wieku Stadionu Śląskiego" Część 4, 17 lipca 2006, page: 1, 2, 3, 4

External links

 
Stadium history 

Buildings and structures in Chorzów
Football venues in Poland
Speedway venues in Poland
Poland
Sports venues in Silesian Voivodeship
Sports venues completed in 1956
1956 establishments in Poland